The second season of Date A Live, titled Date A Live II, is an anime series adapted from the light novels of the same title written by Kōshi Tachibana and illustrated by Tsunako. The story follows the adventures of Shido Itsuka and the Spirits, supernatural female entities that have fallen in love with him. It was produced by Production IMS and directed by Keitaro Motonaga, the second season, covering volumes 5 to 7, ran from April 12, 2014 to June 14, 2014. The opening theme is "Trust in You" by sweet ARMS while the ending theme is "Day to Story" by Kaori Sadohara.


Episode list

Notes

References

External links
  
 

2014 Japanese television seasons
2